In breastfeeding, lactation failure may refer to:
 Primary lactation failure, a cause of low milk supply in breastfeeding mothers
 Cessation of breastfeeding before the mother had planned to stop, usually as a result of breastfeeding difficulties
 Low milk supply in general

Lactation failure can result in neonatal jaundice.

References

External links 

Breastfeeding